Faisal Ali Hassan Salem bin Aqeel (or romanized as bin Akil; born 28 December 1981) is an Emarati footballer who currently plays for Dubai CSC.

He scored for Al Ain in 2002–03 AFC Champions League.

He wore no. 9 shirt and just played 2 matches in 2007 AFC Champions League. One as starter, one as substitute.

References

External links

alainfc.net

Emirati footballers
Al Ain FC players
Dubai CSC players
Association football forwards
1981 births
Living people
Footballers at the 2002 Asian Games
UAE Pro League players
Asian Games competitors for the United Arab Emirates